Abe Fornés (21 September 1939 – October 1978) was a Puerto Rican long-distance runner. He competed in the marathon at the 1964 Summer Olympics.

References

External links
 

1939 births
1978 deaths
Athletes (track and field) at the 1964 Summer Olympics
Puerto Rican male long-distance runners
Puerto Rican male marathon runners
Olympic track and field athletes of Puerto Rico
Place of birth missing